Dámaso José Lescaille Tabares (December 11, 1934 – January 27, 2014) was a Cuban revolutionary, journalist, intelligence officer and ambassador.

Career 
From a very young age he participated in clandestine work against the regime of Fulgencio Batista. 
In 1959 belonged to founders of the Dirección General de Inteligencia.
In the early 1960s he trained Tamara Bunke.
In 1965 he accompanied Che Guevara to Kigoma, the missions in the Guinea-Bissau War of Independence and learned Swahili language.
In 1970 he was counsellor in the embassy in Algiers.
On the  he was military adviser in Santiago de Chile.
From 1975 to  he was deputy head of the American Department of the Central Committee of the Communist Party of Cuba. 
From  to  he was Ambassador in Kingston, Jamaica.
On  Jamaican opposition leader Edward Seaga claimed, that Estrada would have a shady background and is known as a political activist.  In 1980, Seaga became prime minister and Estrada was declared persona non grata.
He headed the Directorate of Non-Aligned Movement and was Director of Africa and Middle East in the Ministry of Foreign Affairs (Cuba).
From  to  he was ambassador to Aden (South Yemen)
From 1987 to 1991 he was ambassador to Algiers and concurrently accredited to Nouakchott, Mauritania, and the Sahrawi Arab Democratic Republic.
He was editor-in-chief of the newspapers Granma International and El Habanero and of the magazine Tricontinental.

References 

1934 births
2014 deaths
Ambassadors of Cuba to Jamaica
Ambassadors of Cuba to South Yemen
Ambassadors of Cuba to Algeria
Ambassadors of Cuba to Mauritania
Ambassadors of Cuba to the Sahrawi Arab Democratic Republic
Cuban editors